Uneven Fairways: The Story of the Negro Leagues of Golf is a 2009 documentary film of the history of African-American golfers. The documentary premiered on the Golf Channel on February 11, 2009 and is based on the books Uneven Fairways by Pete McDaniel, and Forbidden Fairways, by Dr. Calvin Sinnette. The film was directed by Dan Levinson.

Premise
A documentary about the history of African-American golfers speaks some ... to almost officially step forward and say that if it weren't for the struggles and ... and dedication [and] great love of the game of golf, as I have said, my father.

Contributors

Charlie Sifford – 
James Black – 
Pete Brown – 
Thomas Smith – 
Arnold Palmer – 
John Shippen – 
Bill Spiller – 
Jim Thorpe – 
Charles Owens – 
Renee Powell – 
Calvin Peete – 
Ted Rhodes – 
Lee Elder – 
Leonard Jones – 
Pete McDaniel – 
John Merchant – 
Albert Green – 
Billy Gardenhight – 
Tiger Woods – 
Gary Player – 
Lee Trevino – 
Ron Terry – 
Dr. Jeffrey Sammons – 
Lawrence Londino – 
Darrel Knicely – 
Jeffrey Dunovant – 
Alton Duhon – 
Dr. Calvin Sinnette –  
Bill Wright – UGA Player, 
Adrian Stills – 
Kenneth Sims – 
Jack Nicklaus – 
Joe Louis – 
Ben Hogan –

See also
National Black Golf Hall of Fame
United Golf Association
Sinnette, Calvin. 
McDaniel, Pete.

References

External links

 at the Golf Channel

2009 television films
2009 films
2009 documentary films
American documentary television films
American sports documentary films
Golf films
2000s English-language films
2000s American films